Rumphi is a district in the Northern Region of Malawi. The capital is Rumphi. The district covers an area of 4,769 km.² and has a population of 128,360.

Geography
Rumphi District extends from Lake Malawi in the east to the Zambian border in the west. The northern end of the Mzimba Plain extends into the eastern portion of the district. Most of the district is drained by the South Rukuru River and its tributaries. The Viphya Mountains extend into the southeastern portion of the district, and much of central portion of the district lies on the Nyika Plateau.

Vwaza Marsh Wildlife Reserve covers the western end of the district, and Nyika National Park covers much of the center.

Rumphi is the district capital. Other towns include Chilumba, Chitango, Chiweta, and Livingstonia.

Demographics
At the time of the 2018 Census of Malawi, the distribution of the population of Rumphi District by ethnic group was as follows:
 86.1% Tumbuka
 5.0% Chewa
 2.4% Ngoni
 1.7% Lomwe
 1.2% Yao
 1.1% Lambya
 0.8% Nkhonde
 0.5% Tonga
 0.3% Sukwa
 0.1% Mang'anja
 0.1% Sena
 0.1% Nyanja
 0.5% Others

Government and administrative divisions

There are three National Assembly constituencies in Rumphi:

 Rumphi - East
 Rumphi - North
 Rumphi - West

Since the 2009 election all of these constituencies have been held by members of an independent party.

Notable residents
Rumphi has produced some notable residents like:
Edgar Chibaka, founder and Managing Editor of the Nyasa Times one of Malawi's top online and print newspaper.
Chakufwa Chihana 'the father of Malawian Democracy', founder of AFORD
Dindi Gowa Nyasulu, Malawian engineer and former President of AFORD
Kamlepo Kalua, president of an opposition party
Dennis Nkhwazi, a former member of the cabinet
Mwiza Munthali, talk show host and activist
Kenneth Thindwa, pharmacist, entrepreneur and politician
Moses Chirambo, ophthalmologist, entrepreneur, and politician
Robert Ng'ambi, soccer player
Gabadhinyo Mhango, soccer player
Jacob Kumwenda, Entrepreneur, Agribusiness Specialist  and Project Manager at ACE

References

Districts of Malawi
Districts in Northern Region, Malawi